Nuno Miguel Ribeiro Cruz Jerónimo Sequeira (born 19 August 1990) is a Portuguese professional footballer who plays for S.C. Braga as a left-back.

He made over 175 Primeira Liga appearances for Nacional and Braga, winning the 2020–21 Taça de Portugal and the 2019–20 Taça da Liga with the latter club.

Club career

Early career
Born in Porto, Sequeira finished his development at Leixões SC. He made his senior debut in the lower leagues, with Leça F.C. and AD Fafe.

Sequeira returned to the Estádio do Mar for the 2012–13 season. He made his first appearance in the Segunda Liga on 12 August 2012, playing the full 90 minutes in a 1–0 home win against C.S. Marítimo B.

Nacional
Sequeira signed with Primeira Liga club C.D. Nacional in late March 2013, with the four-year contract being made effective in the summer. His maiden game in the competition took place on 23 November of the same year in a 1–1 away draw to FC Porto where he also started, but he totalled just 13 matches in his first two seasons.

Sequeira scored his first goal in the Portuguese top division on 27 November 2015, contributing to a 3–1 home victory over C.S. Marítimo in the Madeira derby. Starting in all of his 31 appearances during the campaign, he helped his team to a final 11th position in the table.

Braga
On 24 May 2017, following Nacional's relegation in last place, Sequeira moved to fellow top-tier side S.C. Braga on a four-year deal. He scored his first goal on 30 October 2018, in a 5–0 home defeat of his previous club in the group stage of the Taça da Liga.

Sequeira played the full 90 minutes on 25 January 2020, as they won the aforementioned tournament by a single goal in the final against Porto. His season ended six games early in June, due to a left-thigh muscle injury at the end of the derby with Vitória de Guimarães.

On 7 November 2021, in the dying minutes of the first half of an eventual 6–1 away loss against S.L. Benfica, Sequeira ruptured the anterior cruciate ligament in his left knee, being sidelined for the campaign. He returned the following August for the start of the new season, assisting in a 3–3 draw with Sporting CP in the opener and then scoring his first Braga league goal in a 3–0 win at F.C. Famalicão.

International career
In October 2020, Fernando Santos called Sequeira to the Portugal national team for the first time, ahead of a friendly with Spain and the UEFA Nations League matches against France and Sweden to be held in that month.

Honours
Braga
Taça de Portugal: 2020–21
Taça da Liga: 2019–20

References

External links

1990 births
Living people
Portuguese footballers
Footballers from Porto
Association football defenders
Primeira Liga players
Liga Portugal 2 players
Segunda Divisão players
Leixões S.C. players
Leça F.C. players
AD Fafe players
C.D. Nacional players
S.C. Braga players
Portugal youth international footballers